1,2,3,5-Tetrahydroxybenzene is a benzenetetrol.

It is a metabolite in the degradation of 3,4,5-trihydroxybenzoate (gallic acid) by Eubacterium oxidoreducens.

The enzyme pyrogallol hydroxytransferase uses 1,2,3,5-tetrahydroxybenzene and 1,2,3-trihydroxybenzene (pyrogallol), whereas its two products are 1,3,5-trihydroxybenzene (phloroglucinol) and 1,2,3,5-tetrahydroxybenzene.

See also 
 Trihydroxybenzenes
 Pentahydroxybenzene

References 

Phenols